Oleksandr Kozak (born 25 July 1994) is a Ukrainian professional footballer who plays as a midfielder for Inhulets Petrove.

Career
In 2014, he signed his first professional contract with FC Metalurh Donetsk.

He made his debut for FC Metalurh Donetsk against FC Hoverla Uzhhorod on 23 May 2015 in the Ukrainian Premier League.

References

External links
 

1994 births
Living people
Footballers from Kyiv
Piddubny Olympic College alumni
Ukrainian footballers
FC Obolon-Brovar Kyiv players
FC Obolon-2 Kyiv players
FC Metalist Kharkiv players
FC Metalurh Donetsk players
Ukrainian Premier League players
Ukrainian First League players
Ukrainian Second League players
FC Stal Kamianske players
FC Mariupol players
FC Illichivets-2 Mariupol players
FC Inhulets Petrove players

Association football midfielders